The Beriev Be-4 (originally designated KOR-2) was a reconnaissance flying boat built to operate from Soviet warships during World War II.

Design and development
In 1939, Beriev was ordered to develop a successor to the KOR-1 design, which would overcome the numerous problems encountered in operational experience with that design. The new aircraft, with the in-house designation KOR-2, first flew on 21 October 1940 at the Beriev factory in Taganrog.

The Be-4 was an elegant, parasol-winged monoplane with a slight inverse-gull wing. The large radial engine was mounted in a nacelle above the fuselage.

Testing continued through January 1941, when series production was ordered under the designation Be-4, at a factory near Moscow. However, due to the start of World War II, only two aircraft were completed. The factory was dismantled, and evacuated to Omsk, then to Krasnoyarsk, where production resumed in May 1943 to the end of 1945. A total of 47 aircraft were eventually completed.

Operational history
The Be-4 was placed into operational service with the Russian Black Sea Fleet from 1942, where it was used for coastal reconnaissance, anti-submarine and transport duties. It was also used on the cruisers Maxim Gorki and Kirov.

Operators

Soviet Naval Aviation

Specifications

See also

References

External links

  Beriev KOR 2 Be 4 at Century of Flight
  Be-4, KOR-2 by G.M.Beriev  at Russian Aviation Museum

Be-0004
1940s Soviet military reconnaissance aircraft
Flying boats
Single-engined tractor aircraft
Parasol-wing aircraft
Aircraft first flown in 1940
Inverted gull-wing aircraft